Tigri is a village in the Bhiwani district of the Indian state of Haryana. , the village had 118 households with a total population of 653 of which 353 were male and 300 female.

References

Villages in Bhiwani district